Heathfield Terrace was an authorised underground railway station planned by the Central London Railway (CLR) but never built. It was to be located at the north-east corner of Turnham Green at the junction of Heathfield Terrace and Chiswick High Road, in Chiswick, in west London.

Plan

The station was to have been built on the CLR's planned underground extension from Shepherd's Bush to Gunnersbury proposed to parliament in November 1912. The extension was to continue on the London and South Western Railway (L&SWR) surface tracks to Richmond already used by the District Railway (DR). The station would have been between Gunnersbury to the west and Turnham Green to the east.

The CLR received permission for the extension on  1913 in the Central London Railway Act, 1913. 

World War I prevented the works from commencing and the permission expired. In 1919, the CLR revived the plan for an extension to Richmond using a different route via the existing L&SWR/DR tracks to the north. Parliamentary approval for the new route was received in 1920, but again the works were not carried out.

Notes

References

Unbuilt London Underground stations
Proposed London Underground stations
Tube stations in the London Borough of Hounslow